Minquan West Road (formerly transliterated as Minchuan West Road Station until 2003) is a metro station in Taipei, Taiwan served by Taipei Metro.

Station overview

The station is a three-level, underground structure with two island platforms and ten exits.  The washrooms are inside the entrance areas.

The station is situated on Minquan West Road, near Chengde Road. The Tamsui–Xinyi line station is underneath the metro park, while the Zhonghe–Xinlu line station is located underneath Minquan West Road.

History
The station was opened on 28 March 1997 for the Tamsui-Xinyi Line. On 1 June 2003; the Xinzhuang Line construction began on the still-operational station. This station was opened on 3 November 2010 for the Xinzhuang Line.

Construction
With the opening of the Xinzhuang Line, the station became a three-level underground station with two cross island platforms. Excavation depth is at around 22 meters. The Xinzhuang Line station is 235 meters long and 26 meters wide, with six additional entrances, two vent shafts, and an accessibility elevator.

Station layout

Exits
Exit 1: Minquan W. Rd. (South side of Minquan W. Rd.) 
Exit 2: Jinxi St. (Beside the Chengyuan High School) 
Exit 3: South Plaza (On the linear park) 
Exit 4: Tianxiang Rd. (Lane 70, Minquan W. Rd.) 
Exit 5: Chengde Rd. Sec. 3 (Fushun Rd., near Chengde Rd.)
Exit 6: Chengyuan High School (Southeast side of the intersection of Minquan W. Rd. and Chengde Rd.)
Exit 7: Zhongshan N. Rd. Sec. 2 (Southwest side of the intersection of Minquan W. Rd. and Tianxiang Rd.)
Exit 8: Zhongshan N. Rd. Sec. 2 (Southwest side of the intersection of Minquan W. Rd. and Tianxiang Rd.)
Exit 9: Zhongshan N. Rd. Sec. 3 (Northwest side of the intersection of Minquan W. Rd. and Tianxiang Rd.)
Exit 10: Zhongshan N. Rd. Sec. 3 (Northwest side of the intersection of Minquan W. Rd. and Tianxiang Rd.)

Around the station
 Chiang Wei-shui Memorial Park
 Taipei Bridge
 Tatung University
 Tatung Company Headquarters
Wunchang Temple
Zhongshan North Road Wedding Dress Road
United Bus Services Minquan W. Rd. Station
Taipei Tatung Recreation Center (between this station and Yuanshan station)
Chengyuan Senior High School
Datong Elementary School
Shuanglian Elementary School
Hotel Sunroute Taipei (between this station and Zhongshan Elementary School station)
Fudu Hotel
Jinxi Park
Datong Police Department

References

Tamsui–Xinyi line stations
Zhonghe–Xinlu line stations
Railway stations opened in 1997